Franklin County is a county along the Gulf of Mexico in the panhandle of the U.S. state of Florida. As of the 2020 census, the population was 12,451, making it the third-least populous county in Florida. The county seat is Apalachicola.

The county includes several large preserved areas and rivers and has been home to commercial timber and fishing industry. More recently it has become popular for tourism and retirement. It includes several rivers, state parks, and islands.

History
Franklin County was founded in 1832. It was named for Benjamin Franklin.

The second largest town in Franklin County is Carrabelle, 25 miles east of Apalachicola on the Carrabelle River.

Camp Gordon Johnston

During World War II most of Franklin County was used by the U.S. Army for amphibious and jungle training, for which the beaches and islands were ideal. When the war ended and the military left, Lanark Village was established from the remaining officer's quarters.

Geography

Franklin County includes part of Tate's Hell State Forest. Bald Point State Park is nearby. The county's river's include the Carrabelle River and its tributaries the New River (Florida Panhandle) and Crooked River (Florida), visited by paddlers. The extreme eastern tip of the county is bordered by the Ochlockonee River.

Adjacent counties
 Liberty County, Florida – north
 Wakulla County, Florida – northeast
 Gulf County, Florida – west (northern part of the county observes CDT/CST time)

National protected areas
 Apalachicola National Forest (part)
 St. Vincent National Wildlife Refuge (part)

Barrier Islands
 Cape St. George Island
 Dog Island
 St. George Island
 St. Vincent Island

Also, St. James Island, while part of the mainland, is technically an island, being separated from the rest of Franklin County by rivers and an estuary.

Historic sites
 Crooked River Light
 Prospect Bluff Historic Sites

Demographics

As of the 2020 United States census, there were 12,451 people, 4,691 households, and 2,926 families residing in the county.

As of the census of 2000, there were 11,057 people, 4,096 households, and 2,727 families residing in the county.  The population density was 20 people per square mile (8/km2).  There were 7,180 housing units at an average density of 13 per square mile (5/km2).  The racial makeup of the county was 81.24% White, 16.32% Black or African American, 0.45% Native American, 0.20% Asian, 0.02% Pacific Islander, 0.43% from other races, and 1.34% from two or more races.  2.42% of the population were Hispanic or Latino of any race.

There were 4,096 households, out of which 24.80% had children under the age of 18 living with them, 52.50% were married couples] living together, 9.80% had a female householder with no husband present, and 33.40% were non-families. 28.70% of all households were made up of individuals, and 11.80% had someone living alone who was 65 years of age or older.  The average household size was 2.28 and the average family size was 2.77.

In the county, the population was spread out, with 18.00% under the age of 18, 7.60% from 18 to 24, 30.80% from 25 to 44, 27.80% from 45 to 64, and 15.70% who were 65 years of age or older.  The median age was 41 years. For every 100 females there were 129.60 males.  For every 100 females age 18 and over, there were 135.70 males.

The median income for a household in the county was $26,756, and the median income for a family was $31,157. Males had a median income of $25,101 versus $20,494 for females. The per capita income for the county was $16,140.  About 11.80% of families and 17.70% of the population were below the poverty line, including 23.20% of those under age 18 and 13.90% of those age 65 or over.

Education
Franklin County residents are within the Franklin County School District. All Students K-12 attend the Franklin County School at Eastpoint, FL, except those attending the Apalachicola Bay Charter School or other private schools.

Libraries
The Franklin County Public Library works with the Wilderness Coast Public Libraries. The FCPL has two library branches.
 Carrabelle
 Eastpoint
In addition, Franklin County has the Apalachicola Margaret Key Library, an independent library with a history of providing services for over 100 years. It is not a member of Wilderness  Coast, but is recognized the state.

Politics

Voter Registration

Statewide Elections

Communities

Towns
 Apalachicola
 Carrabelle

Census-designated places
 Eastpoint
 St. George Island

Unincorporated communities
 Alligator Point
 Bald Point
 Lanark Village
 St. Teresa

Transportation

Airports
 Apalachicola Regional Airport
 Carrabelle-Thompson Airport
 St. George Island Airport

See also
 National Register of Historic Places listings in Franklin County, Florida

Notes

References

External links

Government links/constitutional offices
 Franklin County Board of County Commissioners
 Franklin County Clerk of Court
 Franklin County Supervisor of Elections
 Franklin County Property Appraiser
 Franklin County Sheriff's Office
 Franklin County Tax Collector

Special districts
 Franklin County Schools
 Northwest Florida Water Management District

Judicial branch
 Franklin County Clerk of Courts
  Public Defender, 2nd Judicial Circuit of Florida serving  Franklin, Gadsden, Jefferson, Leon, Liberty, and Wakulla counties
  Office of the State Attorney, 2nd Judicial Circuit of Florida
  Circuit and County Court for the 2nd Judicial Circuit of Florida

Tourism links
 Franklin County Tourist Development Council
 Apalachicola Bay Chamber of Commerce
 Carrabelle Area Chamber of Commerce
 St. George Island Visitor Center & Lighthouse Museum

 
Florida counties
1832 establishments in Florida Territory
Populated places established in 1832
North Florida